The flag of Amazonas Department was officially adopted by means of the Commissarial Decree Nº 090 of August 21, 1974.

Design

The dimensions of the flag are 2.10 meters in length by 1.30 meters in width. The green top stripe is 90 cm in width, the yellow mustard stripe is 8 cm with two fimbriated stripes in black 0.5 cm each, and the white stripe is 32 cm. The flag is defaced by three charges all in sable, the Indian represents the people of Amazonas, the jaguar its fauna and natural resources, and the star represents the capital city of Leticia.

The Gubernatorial Flag is not defaced but charged with the coat of arms of Amazonas Department in the centre of the upper band and it serves as the Governor's Standard.

See also
 Coat of arms of the Department of Amazonas

References

2. 

Flags of the departments of Colombia
Amazonas Department
Amazonas
Amazonas
Flags displaying animals